Lene Tystad (born  in Trondheim) is a Norwegian wheelchair curler and ice sledge speed racer.

As an ice sledge speed racer she participated at the 1998 Winter Paralympic Games and won a bronze medal at 1000 m LW11 event. She also participated at three ice sledge racing events: 100 m LW11 (5th place), 500 m LW11 (4th place) and 1500 m LW11 (4th place).

As a wheelchair curler she participated at the 2006 and 2010 Winter Paralympics. She is a two-time  curler.

Wheelchair curling teams and events

References

External links 

Profile at the Official Website for the 2010 Winter Paralympics in Vancouver

Living people
1975 births
Sportspeople from Trondheim
Norwegian female curlers
Norwegian wheelchair curlers
Paralympic wheelchair curlers of Norway
Wheelchair curlers at the 2006 Winter Paralympics
Wheelchair curlers at the 2010 Winter Paralympics
World wheelchair curling champions
Norwegian female speed skaters
Paralympic ice sledge speed racers of Norway
Ice sledge speed racers at the 1998 Winter Paralympics
Paralympic bronze medalists for Norway
Medalists at the 1998 Winter Paralympics
Paralympic medalists in ice sledge speed racing